Richard Merrill Rosenbaum (April 8, 1931 – July 28, 2019) was an American lawyer, political activist, boxer, and author who served as a judge of the New York Supreme Court.

References

1931 births
2019 deaths
20th-century American lawyers
Activists from Rochester, New York
American judges
American male boxers
Lawyers from Rochester, New York
New York (state) Republicans
New York Supreme Court Justices
20th-century American judges